Platycochlium is a genus of air-breathing land snails, terrestrial pulmonate gastropod mollusks in the family Streptaxidae.

Distribution 
The distribution of the genus Platycochlium includes:
 Kalimantan, Borneo, Indonesia

Species
Species within the genus Platycochlium include:
 Platycochlium barnaclei Dance, 1970
 Platycochlium sarawakense Laidlaw, 1950
 Platycochlium saulae Dance, 1970

References

Streptaxidae